

Fly My Pretties is a collaboration of musicians originally from Wellington, New Zealand who are known for coming together to record live albums, in various locations in New Zealand. The different musical backgrounds of the members make for an eclectic mix of songs on their releases. Fly My Pretties was the brainchild of Barnaby Weir, front man of the Black Seeds and Mikee Tucker of Loop Recordings Aot(ear)oa. The objective: To meet, exchange ideas, and then perform and record the results in front of a live audience.

History
Founded in Wellington in 2004, the Fly My Pretties cast includes musicians from the Black Seeds, Fat Freddy's Drop, The Phoenix Foundation, Cairo Knife Fight and Paseload to achieve a unique blend of musical styles. The group is not a band as such, rather a collection of contemporary musicians who come together to collaborate on songs written by different members of the band. The first album featured songs written by Weir, Age Pryor and Samuel Flynn Scott.

Fly My Pretties performed their first season at Wellington's Bats Theatre over five nights.  Their first album 'Fly My Pretties Live at Bats' achieved platinum-status and was released internationally in the UK. The album received six nominations (Best Pop Release, Best Album, Best Producer, Best Cover Art, Best Female Vocalist, Best DVD) and won Best Pop Release at the 2005 bNet New Zealand Music Awards.

In 2006, Fly My Pretties performed, recorded, and then released a second album, 'The Return of... Fly My Pretties' which focused on the state of contemporary Aotearoa New Zealand. The 2006 shows sold-out nationwide and the second album reached platinum-status. 'The Return of... Fly My Pretties' won Best Aotearoa, Roots album at the 2007 New Zealand Music Awards.

Fly My Pretties toured and recorded a new album in 2009 titled 'Fly My Pretties – A Story'. The show was a conceptual extension of the previous two Fly My Pretties outings, expressed via a narrative that connects music, illustration, animation, charity and a message of change into one audiovisual experience. The Fly My Pretties story attempts to entertain and reflect on innocence, and the solving of complex problems which might enable a sustainable future. With this in mind, the cast put together their songs in just eight rehearsals before taking the show on the road. The album reached #1 on the top 40 RIANZ album charts. The third album was nominated for Best Aotearoa, Roots Album at the 2010 Vodafone new Zealand Music Awards.

The collective released 'Fly My Pretties IV' in 2011. The 16 new songs were performed, filmed and recorded live across nine shows during the eponymously named "Fly My Pretties IV" tour, – which included the collective's first international appearance – one sold-out Melbourne date. The new Fly My Pretties show saw 16 musicians unite with an exciting new concept, re-inspired style and re-invigorated sound. Via a collaboration with street artist Flox, 16 original and dedicated pieces of art were created and brought to life through projection, animation and visual trickery throughout the show.

In 2013 Fly My Pretties embarked on the 'Homeland Tour' – a journey from the tip to the tail of New Zealand, seeing them travel to 18 towns to perform 23 shows. The tour saw Fly My Pretties hark back to their musical roots with a sound stepped in folk, roots, soul & rock. For the tour the collective forged partnerships with Archives New Zealand and the Alexander Turnbull Library, National Library of New Zealand – both content partners providing precious historical footage from the regions toured, which were visually woven into each song's performance to craft a unique story about New Zealand. The result of the tour was the collective's fifth album, 'The Homeland Recordings' – 13 tracks spanning country, folk, rock, R&B, and soul – all captured live.

Over the years, Fly My Pretties have only ever performed a small selection of shows outside of their tours including the prestigious WOMAD 2013 and Queenstown Blues & Roots Festival.

Members
 Barnaby Weir (Vocals, Percussion & Guitar)
 Aaron Tokona (Guitar & Vocals)
 Adi Dick (Guitar & Vocals)
 Age Pryor (Guitar & Vocals)
 Amiria Grenell (Guitar & Vocals)
 Anna Coddington (Guitar, Vocals & Shaker)
 Anika Moa (Guitar & Vocals)
 Bailey Wiley (Vocals)
 Brendan Moran (Drums)
 Craig Terris (Drums & Vocals)
 Daniel Weetman (Drums, Percussion & Vocals)
 Darryn Sigley (Drums)
 Eva Prowse (Violin, Vocals, & Mandolin)
 Fran Kora (Vocals, Bass)
 Flip Grater (Guitar & Vocals)
 Hollie Smith (Guitar, Keyboards & Vocals)
 Iraia Whakamoe (Drums)
 James Coyle (Keys)
 Jarney Murphy (Drums)
 Jayson Norris (Guitar & Vocals)
 Justin 'Firefly' Clarke (Vocals, Guitar, Mandolin)
 Kara Gordon (Guitar & Vocals)
 L.A. Mitchell (Rhodes, Vocals)
 Laughton Kora (Guitar & Vocals)
 Lee Prebble (Lap Steel)
 Lisa Tomlins (Vocals)
 Louis McDonald (Guitar & Vocals)
 Luke Buda (Guitar & Vocals)
 Mailee Mathews (Bass)
 Mara TK (Guitar, Bass, Tambourine & Vocals)
 Mark Vanilau (Vocals, Keys)
 Mel Parsons (Guitar & Vocals)
 Mike Fabulous (Bass & Guitar)
Miloux (Vocals)
 Module (Piano, Keys & Organ)
 Nathan 'Nato' Hickey (Bass & Percussion)
 Ned Ngatae (Bass)
 Nigal Patterson (Keys)
 Paul McLaney (Guitar & Vocals)
 Ria Hall (Vocals & Percussion)
 Riki Gooch (Drums & Rhodes)
 Rio Hunuki-Hemopo (Vocals, Bass & Tambourine)
 Ryan Prebble (Guitar & Vocals)
 Samuel Flynn Scott (Vocals)
 Shaun Blackwell (Vocals, Guitar, Percussion)
 Tessa Rain (Guitar & Vocals)
 Toby Laing (Rhodes & Synth)
 Tom Watson (Guitar & Vocals)

Discography

References

External links
Fly My Pretties at Myspace
 

New Zealand rock music groups